Henrik Pürg (born 3 June 1996) is an Estonian professional footballer who plays as a centre back for Meistriliiga club Flora and the Estonia national team.

International career
Pürg made his senior international debut for Estonia on 11 January 2019, in a 2–1 friendly win over Finland.

Honours

Club
Nõmme Kalju II
Esiliiga B: 2013

Nõmme Kalju
Estonian Cup: 2014–15

Flora
Meistriliiga: 2019, 2020
Estonian Cup: 2019–20
Estonian Supercup: 2020, 2021

References

External links

1996 births
Living people
Footballers from Tallinn
Estonian footballers
Association football defenders
Esiliiga players
Meistriliiga players
Nõmme Kalju FC players
FC Flora players
Estonia youth international footballers
Estonia under-21 international footballers
Estonia international footballers